Semisulcospira multigranosa is a species of freshwater snail with an operculum, an aquatic gastropod mollusk in the family Semisulcospiridae.

Ecology
Parasites of Semisulcospira multigranosa include trematode Aspidogaster conchicola.

References

Semisulcospiridae